Syntypistis palladina is a species of moth in the family Notodontidae first described by William Schaus in 1928. It is found in Southern Thailand, Sundaland, the Philippines (Palawan and Mindanao). The species prefers lowlands and may be seen the whole year up to 2,000 m.

Jeremy Daniel Holloway synonymized Syntypistis viridimargo and S. palladina, however comparison of genitalia of males from Mindanao and Sundaland revealed significant differences. This indicates that S. viridimargo may be a subspecies of S. palladina.

References

External links

Moths described in 1928
Moths of Borneo
Moths of Sumatra
Moths of Asia
Moths of Malaysia
Notodontidae